"A Forest Hymn" is an 1824 poem written by William Cullen Bryant, which has been called one of Bryant's best poems, and "one of the best nature poems of that age". It was first published in Boston in the United States Literary Gazette along with several other poems written by Bryant.

Analysis and reception
Said to have been only conceivable by someone familiar with the "thick foliage and tall trunks of [the] primeval forests" in Massachusetts, "A Forest Hymn" is said to have been Bryant's way of saying farewell to country life before moving to New York City in 1825, which came about during a period where he wrote a large number of works. It is reflective of Bryant's love of nature and religious belief, has been called a "picturesque poem", and Richard Henry Stoddard has said:
 At the pace of the wind "playing upon the leaves and the branches of the ancient woods, Eleanor O'Grady has suggested that the poem be read in a smooth and gliding manner, as done in Median Stress.

The poem has been published many times, including an 1860 edition with illustrations by John A. Hows.

John Muir's first article advocating forest protection, a February 5, 1876, editorial in the Sacramento Daily Record-Union, alludes to Bryant's first line in its title: "God's First Temples: How Shall We Preserve Our Forests".

References

Sources

External links

An outline of the poem: pages 113 to 117 in Intensive studies in American literature at Google Books.

1824 poems